Whyteleafe railway station serves the village of Whyteleafe right on the border of Greater London and Surrey, England. The station and all trains serving it are operated by Southern, and it is on the Caterham Line.

It is a short walk from Upper Warlingham railway station on the Oxted Line, which runs parallel to the Caterham Line for most of its length. The station, opened on 1 January 1900 (after the line), has a single-storey ticket office on the Up side, and a double barrier CCTV crossing at the country end of the station.

Services 

All services at Whyteleafe are operated by Southern using  EMUs.

The typical off-peak service in trains per hour is:

 2 tph to 

Up until September 2022 there were additional off-peak services to London Bridge via Norbury and Tulse Hill.

References

External links 

History of the branch line

Railway stations in Surrey
Former South Eastern Railway (UK) stations
Railway stations in Great Britain opened in 1900
Railway stations served by Govia Thameslink Railway